U.S. Route 91 or U.S. Highway 91 (US-91) is a  north–south United States highway running from Brigham City, Utah, to Idaho Falls, Idaho, in the U.S. states of Idaho and Utah. Despite the "1" as the last digit in the number, US-91 is no longer a cross-country artery, as it has mostly been replaced by Interstate 15. The highway currently serves to connect the communities of the Cache Valley to I-15 and beyond. Prior to the mid-1970s, US 91 was an international commerce route from Long Beach, California, to the Canada–US border north of Sweetgrass, Montana. US 91 was routed on the main streets of most of the communities it served, including Las Vegas Boulevard in Las Vegas and State Street in Salt Lake City. From Los Angeles to Salt Lake, the route was built along the corridor of the Arrowhead Trail.  A portion of the highway's former route in California is currently State Route 91.

Route description

Utah
US-91 begins at Brigham City. The highway was originally routed through Brigham City, but today runs on a southern bypass (locally designated 1100 South). The original routing is now State Route 90. In Brigham City, US-89 becomes concurrent with US-91. 

After leaving Brigham City, the highway begins to climb the Wellsville Mountains. The entire grade across these mountains is colloquially called "Sardine Canyon". However, Sardine Canyon is the canyon originally used by the first settlers to mark a trail to Cache Valley, so named as they used the litter from their lunch of canned sardines to mark the trail. A new route was constructed in the 1950s that uses the same mountain pass, Sardine Summit, as the old road, however follows different canyons down from the summit. Despite the modern route of US 91 no longer using Sardine Canyon, the name continues to be used by locals and news media alike in describing the traffic, weather conditions or scenery along the entire grade across the Wellsville Mountains.

US 91 enters the Wellsville Mountains via Box Elder Canyon in a climb to the lake and town of  Mantua, which has a reputation as a speed trap. After passing the reservoir, the highway resumes climbing, using Dry Canyon to reach Sardine Summit. The highway descends through Wellsville Canyon and reaches the Cache Valley, where it serves as the major thoroughfare. Logan is the largest city in the valley. At Logan, US-89 splits off to the east towards Bear Lake, while US-91 continues north through the valley to the Idaho state line. Both the Utah and Idaho portions of Cache Valley are part of the Logan metropolitan area.

The Utah section of US-91 is defined at Utah Code Annotated § 72-4-115(1). In addition, the segment south of the SR-142 intersection in Richmond is included in the National Highway System.

Idaho
US-91 continues serving the Idaho portion of the Cache Valley with Preston as the largest city. The highway passes by the Bear River Massacre Site, a National Historic Landmark, near Preston, and over the geologically significant Red Rock Pass, near Downey.

After leaving Cache Valley, the highway then crosses back to rejoin Interstate 15. At Pocatello, US-91, US-30, and I-15 Business Loop separate from Interstate 15 and run concurrently, passing through a small portion of the Idaho State University campus.  US-30 separates from US-91 near Pocatello's city hall at what was once the starting point of one of Idaho's first designated highways, the Yellowstone Park Highway.  From this point the highway generally follows the original route of the Yellowstone Park Highway northeastward, until it reaches its terminus at its intersection with US-26, south of Idaho Falls.

History
At its peak, from 1947 to 1965, U.S. Route 91 extended from the Pacific Ocean at Long Beach, California to Coutts, Alberta. Though a good portion of the highway fit the US highway numbering grid, overall, US 91's northern terminus was east of US 89, while its southern terminus was west of US 101.  North of Riverside, California, US 91 followed a route that would be largely paralleled by modern I-15 and I-215 where these routes did not completely supplant it.  There are some parts where US 91/I-15 had divergent paths. The more southerly is from Littlefield, Arizona to St. George, Utah where the two routes took different paths through the Arizona Strip. The more northerly and longer is the surviving portion of US-91 from Brigham City to Downey, where Interstate 15 follows an old route of U.S. Route 191.

Utah first submitted a petition to AASHTO to have the US-91 designation truncated in 1971. This petition was approved on June 21, 1971. However, the state did not take action until 1974. Utah officials co-ordinated a second petition with the transportation departments of California, Nevada and Arizona. In this unified petition officials in Utah proposed the number changeover take place in 1974. Nevada requested postponing the deletion of US 91 as Nevada expected to complete the last piece of I-15 in 1975. Nevada officials suggested U.S. Route 40 be similarly truncated, as this highway largely duplicated Interstate 80 in the same states. Despite Nevada's request, the petition was submitted and approved in 1974.

Retracing the path of historic U.S. Route 91 is possible but difficult. In most cities the route of US 91 is still in use as a local street or highway. In many rural areas, I-15 was built on top of the former US 91.

The highway passed through the following states:
 California (until 1974)
 Nevada (until 1974)
 Arizona (10 miles (16 km) in the Arizona Strip, until 1974)
 Utah
 Idaho
 Montana (until 1980)

California

US 91's original southern terminus was at the intersection of Atlantic Avenue (historically SR 15) and East Pacific Coast Highway (SR 1) in Long Beach. This intersection also marked the historic western terminus of US 6, which proceeded west from that intersection. East of the intersection, US 91 proceeded east along East Pacific Coast Highway to Los Alamitos Circle.

The portions in California were replaced with:
SR 1 (Pacific Coast Highway from Atlantic Avenue to Los Alamitos Circle)
SR 19 (Lakewood Boulevard from Los Alamitos Circle to Lincoln Avenue)
SR 214 (route no longer a state highway – Carson Street and Lincoln Avenue)
SR 91
I-215
I-15

Nevada

The route of US 91 in Nevada was replaced with I-15 in 1974.

South of Las Vegas, most of the old route is still intact, as it runs parallel and to the east of the freeway from Jean to Sloan. Visitors to the popular Seven Magic Mountains art installation must travel at least a dozen miles on the old route to reach the site.

In Las Vegas, US 91 was better known as Las Vegas Boulevard (State Route 604 after the 1976 renumbering of most Nevada state highways). The intersection of Las Vegas Boulevard and Fremont Street is the historic intersection with U.S. 93 and U.S. 95.  Here, U.S. 466 parted ways with US 91 and headed southeast on Fremont Street with southbound US 93 and US 95. At this intersection, US 93 and 95 departed Fremont Street and turned northeast onto Las Vegas Boulevard, heading northbound with US 91. A few blocks further up, at Bonanza Road, US 95 turned west until it hit Rancho Drive, then continued north. US 91/93 stayed aligned with Las Vegas Boulevard, which turned into Salt Lake Highway after departing the city of North Las Vegas.

Until its decertification in 1974, US 91 followed I-15 to exit 112, where it took present-day NV 170 through Riverside to Mesquite, turned right onto NV 144 (Mesquite Boulevard and Sandhill Boulevard), and then followed Hillside Drive into Arizona (where the road became Fairview Avenue).

Arizona

US 91 entered Arizona from Nevada on Fairview Avenue and followed it northeast to Littlefield. Once Fairview Avenue crosses I-15, it became Cane Beds Road through downtown Beaver Dam and into Utah, where the road continued as Old Highway 91. Today, this section of US 91 is known as Mohave County Road 91.

Utah
From the State Line to Saint George US-91 followed a semi-circular route that is now simply called Old Highway 91, though a good portion of the road is signed as Washington County 91. Old Highway 91 continues to Santa Clara and followed what is now SR-8 and SR-18 to St. George. Where SR-18 intersects St. George Blvd, US-91 then continued east on St. George Blvd. (SR-34) until it intersected Red Cliffs Rd. From there, US-91 went in a north-east direction, with Red Cliffs becoming Telegraph St. in Washington. US-91 followed on Telegraph until becoming Main St. in Leeds. After leaving Leeds, Old 91 is still intact until about a half mile north of the junction with SR-228 where its routing runs right into I-15.

US-91 picks up again in Black Rock in northern Washington County at exit 36 on I-15. It continues parallel to I-15 until just past exit 40, then picks up again on the other side of the freeway. This section of the road is not maintained and some of the original paving is still visible between the end of the road at Lower Taylor Creek Trailhead and when normal paving resumes near the road to New Harmony (old SR-144), at I-15 exit 42. The road, marked as Old US-91, then runs north through Kanarraville and into Cedar City near exit 57, merging into Main St (SR-130) until near the city border with Enoch just past exit 62. Old US-91 continues to parallel I-15 to Summit. The road crosses I-15 again at exit 71 and continues its original route through Parowan, merging with SR-274 after briefly running along modern SR-143. There is no additional signage in Parowan to indicate the original route, though historical maps show that it follows SR-271 through Paragonah. There are some frontage roads along I-15 through Beaver that may be sections of the original highway in Iron County.

In Beaver County, sections of SR-160 through Beaver and the road running north through Manderfield use original sections of US-91. There are also sections of roadway that used to be US-91 from before exit 129 through Cove Fort, Utah in Millard County, intersecting both I-70 and later I-15 north of the I-70/I-15 interchange, including what is now SR-161. Some frontage roads along I-15 may be parts of US-91. The route picks up again at exit 146 on SR-133 through Kanosh and Meadow before being supplanted by frontage roads and I-15. SR-99 through Fillmore and SR-64 through Holden are also pieces of US-91 before running concurrently with US-50 until it merges again with I-15.

The original alignment of US-91 also diverges from I-15 through most of Juab County. At Chicken Creek Reservoir, the historic route of US-91 leaves I-15 and follows SR-78 northeast to Levan where it turns north along modern SR-28 and continues through Nephi along that city's Main Street. North of Nephi, it follows what is now Mona Road, passing through Mona, before rejoining the modern I-15 alignment near Rocky Ridge. In Utah County, the old US-91 leaves I-15 again at Santaquin, following SR-198 northeast through Payson and Salem before reaching Spanish Fork. In Spanish Fork, it ran north on Main Street (now SR-156, east on 800 North, and northeast on what is now SR-51 to Springville.

In Springville US-91 first joined US-89 at one of the oldest grade-separated interchanges in Utah (this portion is now SR-51). From this junction to Logan the two highways ran mostly concurrent. This portion is mostly intact as US-89.

However, US-91 diverged from US-89 between Farmington and Ogden. US-91 split away on what is now State Route 273, State Route 126 and State Route 26. These highways form the Main Street through Kaysville and Layton; State Street from the Layton-Clearfield border to Main Street in Clearfield though the city of Sunset turning into 1900 West at the Sunset-Roy border, then following 1900 West to a junction with Riverdale Road in Roy, then following Riverdale Road through Riverdale, and then meeting back up with US-89 at Washington Blvd in Ogden.

Idaho
US-91 formerly entered Idaho Falls along Yellowstone Highway, and returned to the course of modern I-15 north of town. The highway then proceeded north toward Monida Pass where the highway entered Montana. In some small towns streets used by the route are called "Old Highway 91".

Montana
In Montana, the highway's alignment slightly changed with the construction of the Clark Canyon Dam.

Starting just south of Dillon, I-15 was built on a new alignment that mostly parallels US 91 and crosses over it several times. In Dillon, the former route of the highway is now known as Atlantic Street and Montana Street.  The highway formerly joined with U.S. Route 10 between Rocker and downtown Butte and took a northeasterly path to Elk Park Pass before it was rerouted to its current alignment east of Butte in 1980 (today's southbound lanes of I-15).  It formed the main street of Boulder before I-15 was completed, and was routed through Helena along what is now Montana Secondary Highway 518 and Montana Secondary Highway 229.

Because of the new alignment of I-15 in Montana, many segments of the former US 91 are still in use today as frontage roads or sportsmen access points along the Missouri River, especially from Helena north to Great Falls and Sweetgrass, and from Butte south to Divide and Dillon.

In popular culture
The US-91 corridor in Idaho's Cache Valley was the primary filming location for the 2004 movie Napoleon Dynamite. The former U.S. Route 91 corridor was also the birthplace of both McDonald's, with the first location opening on E Street in San Bernardino (E Street was the routing of US 91 before the construction of freeways in the area), as well as the first Kentucky Fried Chicken, with the first location opening in Salt Lake City at State Street and 3900 South. The McDonald's location is now a museum, while the KFC is still in operation with a small historical display inside the restaurant.

Major intersections

See also

 Route 91 Harvest, an annual country music event held from 2014 to 2017 on old US 91 near Las Vegas, Nevada
 U.S. Route 191
 U.S. Route 491
 U.S. Route 91 Alternate (Nevada)

Notes

References

External links

Endpoints of U.S. Highway 91

 
91
91
91
Transportation in Box Elder County, Utah
Transportation in Cache County, Utah
Transportation in Franklin County, Idaho
Transportation in Bannock County, Idaho
Transportation in Bingham County, Idaho
Transportation in Bonneville County, Idaho
91